D0226 and D0227 were two prototype diesel shunting locomotives built in 1956 by English Electric at its Vulcan Foundry in Newton-le-Willows to demonstrate its wares to British Railways. They originally carried numbers D226 and D227, their Vulcan Foundry works numbers, but these were amended in August 1959 to avoid clashing with the numbers of new Class 40 locomotives.

They were both of 0-6-0 wheel arrangement and were fitted with English Electric 6RKT engines of 500 hp. They were painted black with an orange stripe along the middle of the bodyside, which turned into a 'V' at the nose end. The major difference between the two locomotives was that D0226 had diesel-electric transmission and D0227 had diesel-hydraulic transmission. 

BR tested both locomotives at its Stratford depot in East London. D0226 has been preserved at the Keighley & Worth Valley Railway, but D0227 was scrapped.

Further reading

 

D0226
English Electric locomotives
Vulcan Foundry locomotives
C locomotives
Railway locomotives introduced in 1956
Standard gauge locomotives of Great Britain
Diesel-electric locomotives of Great Britain